The 1995 Challenge Bell was a women's tennis tournament played on indoor carpet courts at the Club Avantage Multi-Sports in Quebec City in Canada that was part of Tier III of the 1995 WTA Tour. It was the 3rd edition of the Challenge Bell, and was held from October 30 through November 5, 1995. First-seeded Brenda Schultz-McCarthy won the singles title.

Finals

Singles

 Brenda Schultz-McCarthy defeated  Dominique Monami, 7–6(7–5), 6–2
It was Schultz-McCarthy's 2nd title of the year and the 5th of her career.

Doubles

 Nicole Arendt /  Manon Bollegraf defeated  Lisa Raymond /  Rennae Stubbs, 7–6(8–6), 4–6, 6–2
It was Arendt's 5th title of the year and the 7th of her career. It was Bollegraf's 5th title of the year and the 20th of her career.

External links
Official website

Challenge Bell
Tournoi de Québec
Challenge Bell
1990s in Quebec City